The Superman Family was an American comic book series published by DC Comics from 1974 to 1982 featuring supporting characters in the Superman comics. The term "Superman Family" is often used to refer to the extended cast of characters of comics books associated with Superman. A similarly titled series, Superman Family Adventures, was published in 2012.

Publication history
The Superman Family was an amalgamation of the titles Superman's Girl Friend, Lois Lane, Superman's Pal Jimmy Olsen, and Supergirl. The first issue, #164, took its numbering from Jimmy Olsen, which had reached issue #163 and thus had the most issues published. Lois Lane ended at #137, while the newly launched Supergirl book had only made it to #9 at the time. A 10th and final issue of Supergirl was published five months after Superman Family's launch.

The Superman Family went through two distinct phases. In its inception the three leads Jimmy Olsen, Lois Lane, and Supergirl rotated new stories each issue with reprints for the other characters. The first six issues (#164–169) of the series were in the 100 Page Super Spectacular format and Nick Cardy was the cover artist. Changes were made in the setting of Supergirl's adventures during the character's run in the title. She moves to Florida to join the faculty at the New Athens Experimental School in issue #165. In an "imaginary tale" set in a possible future in issue #200, Supergirl, now known as Superwoman, is depicted as being the Governor of Florida in her secret identity of Linda Danvers. She leaves Florida and relocates to New York City to become a soap opera actress in issue #208.

After the cancellation of Super-Team Family, a Supergirl/Doom Patrol team-up originally scheduled to appear in that title was published in The Superman Family #191–193. Supergirl battled the Enchantress in issues #204–205 and teamed with the Legion of Super-Heroes in issue #207.

The Superman Family became the first DC Comics series in the 80-page Dollar Comic format, consisting of 64 pages of new stories, beginning with issue #182 (March–April 1977). With that issue, the "framing element" was removed from the covers, and the book switched to printing all-new material. It became a monthly series in 1981, starting with issue #207.

Featured series
Lois Lane—The adventures of Lois Lane, where she regularly battled criminals. (#166, #169, #172, #175, #178, #181–222)
Supergirl—The adventures of Supergirl. (#165, #168, #171, #174, #177, #180, #182–222)
Jimmy Olsen—The adventures of Jimmy Olsen. (#164, #167, #170, #173, #176, #179, #182–222)
Superboy—The adventures of the Earth-One Superman as a teenage superhero. This series continued from Adventure Comics #458 and led to the feature leaving the title for its own in 1980, The New Adventures of Superboy. (#182, #191–198)
The Private Life of Clark Kent—The adventures of Clark Kent in which he used his powers and skills without becoming Superman. This feature had moved over from Superman after issue #328 of that series. (#182, #191–197, #199-215) After the cancellation of The Superman Family, it returned to Superman for two more appearances in issues #371 and 373.
Mr. and Mrs. Superman—The adventures of the Earth-Two Superman and his wife, Lois Lane Kent. This feature was moved from the comic book Superman after issue #329. (#195–196, #198–199, #201–222)
Krypto—the adventures of Superman's dog with the aid of detective Ed Lacy. (#182–192) 
Nightwing and Flamebird—the adventures of the second Nightwing and Flamebird team of heroes (Van-Zee and Ak-Var) in the bottle city of Kandor. (#183–194)

DC published several other ... Family titles concurrently with The Superman Family. These included Batman Family (1975–78), Super-Team Family (1975–78) and Tarzan Family (1975–76). As a rule, DC's other ... Family titles contained mostly reprints and featured a higher page count and higher price than DC's other titles.

With issue #222 (September 1982), The Superman Family was canceled and replaced with The Daring New Adventures of Supergirl, which briefly featured a "Lois Lane" backup series.

Superman Family Adventures
In 2012, DC launched a new series titled Superman Family Adventures written by Art Baltazar and Franco Aureliani and drawn by Baltazar. Baltazar and Aureliani are the winners of the 2011 Eisner Award in the category "Best Publication for Kids" for their work on the Tiny Titans title for DC. Fuzzy the Krypto Mouse, a character who appeared in a single story in Superboy #65 (June 1958), inspired a similar character created by Baltazar for Superman Family Adventures. Superman Family Adventures ended with issue #12.

Collected editions
Showcase Presents: Batgirl Vol. 1 includes the Supergirl story from The Superman Family #171, 520 pages, July 2007, 
Superman: The Amazing Transformations of Jimmy Olsen includes the Jimmy Olsen story from The Superman Family #173, 192 pages, July 2007, 
 Superman: The Adventures of Nightwing and Flamebird collects the Jimmy Olsen story from The Superman Family #173 and the Nightwing and Flamebird stories from The Superman Family #183–194, 144 pages, October 2009, 
 Superman: The World of Krypton includes the World of Krypton story from The Superman Family #182, 240 pages, March 2008, 
 Deadman Book Three includes the Lois Lane story from The Superman Family #183, 176 pages, December 2012, 
 Superman: Bottle City of Kandor includes the Nightwing and Flamebird story from The Superman Family #194, 200 pages, October 2007,

References

External links
 
 
 
 

1974 comics debuts
1982 comics endings
2012 comics debuts
2013 comics endings
Comics anthologies
Comics by Gerry Conway
Comics by Marv Wolfman
Comics by Paul Kupperberg
Comics by Paul Levitz
Comics by Roy Thomas
Defunct American comics
Superhero comics
Superman titles

de:Superman (Comicserien)#Superman Family